Trinity Church is a modern church in Esbjerg in the southwest of Jutland, Denmark. Designed by local architects Erik Flagstad Rasmussen and Knud Thomsen, the yellow-brick building with large triangular stained-glass windows was completed in 1961.

Background 
Esbjerg is a city with several new churches, most of which were established after the Second World War when there was a marked increase in the population. Designed to accommodate a large congregation while offering additional facilities for both young and old, Trinity Church was the first of many. Breaking with tradition, its square-shaped nave was built directly adjacent to lower ancillary buildings including a hall with a stage, meeting rooms and a kitchen. The bell tower stands alone, quite separate from the church.

Architecture 
In the late 1950s, Erik Flagstad Rasmussen and Knud Thomsen won the competition which had been specifically directed to attract responses from the city's architects. The church itself is a square-shaped building of yellow brick crowned with a low octagonal spire. There are four triangular gables of glass and concrete, all with pointed tops. Completed in 1967, the stained-glass gable windows were designed by Jens Urup Jensen with themes representing Christmas (north) with a red Star of Bethlehem, Easter (east, above the altar) with a cross, Whitsun (south) with 12 red tongues symbolising the Apostles and a blue-toned Water of Life frame (west) above the organ gallery. The colouring of the north and south windows is rather cool while the designs to the east and west are much warmer.

In 1993, an apse was added. In 1999, the church was seriously damaged by a hurricane which dislodged sections of the copper roof. They were used to make a cross, designed by Erik Heide which stands outside next to the south wall.

Interior 
The walls inside are of plain brick, the flooring of Øland tiles. A simple oak cross hangs above the altar. The font is also of oak while the pulpit is built of concrete with Christ's monogram.

Male choir
Treenighedskirkens Drengekor (Trinity Church's Boys Choir) was founded by organist Per Günther in 1964 who led the choir until he retired 1989. Thereafter, it has been supported by Esbjerg Municipality and the Esbjerg's Academy of Music and Dramatic Arts in collaboration with the church. Today it consists of 50 singers, boys starting at the age of 8 or 9. They give performances of classical church music both at home and abroad. Venues have included St Peters, Rome, Notre Dame de Paris and Westminster Abbey. Their concerts have also been widely broadcast on radio and television, not only in Denmark but in Europe and North America. The choir has also made numerous recordings.

References

Literature

External links 
 Treenighedskirken website 

Buildings and structures in Esbjerg
Churches in the Region of Southern Denmark
Churches completed in 1961
20th-century Church of Denmark churches
Churches in the diocese of Ribe